La Mémoire maritime des arabes is a 2000 documentary film.

Synopsis 
Even before Islam existed, the Arabs were sailing the seas. The sea and its activities were extremely important for these desert people in the 7th century, when they traveled from Spain to China skirting the African coast. Sinbad’s stories are based on those journeys, but reality may well surpass fiction. How does one change from a dromedary to a ship? Their knowledge of astronomy, commerce and science form part of this film shot in twelve countries that covers several centuries and includes the opinion of eminent experts.

Awards 
 ZIFF 2001
 Golden Award for best documentary, Arab Media Film Festival, Cairo, 2010

References 

2000 films
French documentary films
Mauritian documentary films
2000 documentary films
Arab history
Works of maritime history
Seafaring films based on actual events
2000s French-language films
2000s French films